Julián Fuks (born 1981) is a Brazilian writer. He was born in São Paulo to Argentine parents. He has worked for the newspaper Folha de São Paulo and for the magazine Cult. His first book Fragmentos de Alberto, Ulisses, Carolina e eu was published in 2004. He has since published several more books, winning a number of literary prizes. His 2015 novel Resistance won the Jabuti Award for Book of the Year (2016), the Oceanos Prize (2016), the José Saramago Literary Prize (2017) and the Anna Seghers Prize (2018). It has been translated into English by Daniel Hahn. 

Fuks was chosen as one of Granta magazine's Best of Young Brazilian Novelists in 2012. He worked with Mia Couto as part of the Rolex Mentor and Protégé Arts Initiative. He lives in Sao Paulo.

References

21st-century Brazilian novelists
1981 births
Living people
Brazilian people of Argentine descent
Writers from São Paulo
21st-century Brazilian male writers
Brazilian male novelists